The Archivio di Stato di Firenze, is the repository for the public records and archives of the Italian city of Florence. The archive holds over 600 fonds dating back to the 8th century which, laid out in a line, would stretch over 75 km (46 miles).  It was founded on February 20, 1852, by decree of the Grand Duke Leopoldo II of Tuscany. Until 1989, the archive was located in the Uffizi. On November 4, 1966, the River Arno flooded, causing damage to over 60,000 pieces of archival material.    The flood instigated the decision to construct a modern building for the archives further from the River Arno. The new building, designed by Italo Gamberini and his team of architects, was begun in 1974.  It included a space for the conservation laboratory, which was founded shortly after the 1966 to recover damaged documents. Between 1987-1988 archival materials were transferred from the Uffizi to their current location, on the Viale della Giovine Italia, near the Piazza Beccaria in Florence. The new building Staff have included Gaetano Milanesi among others.

See also
 List of State Archives of Italy

References

External links
 

History of Florence
Archives in Italy